This is a bibliography of reference works on film by genre.

Action / adventure

James Bond

Martial arts

War 

 
 Lentz, Robert J. (2003). Korean War Filmography: 91 English Language Features Through 2000. McFarland. .
 
 Picart, Caroline Joan (2004). The Holocaust Film Sourcebook. Praeger. .

Animated

Art/Arthouse

Biographical

Blaxploitation

Comedy

Crime

Film noir

Gangster film 

Hardy, Phil (1998). The Aurum Film Encyclopedia, Volume 4: The Gangster Film. UK: Aurum Press.

Horror / thriller

Horror 

 
 Hardy, Phil (1984). The Aurum Film Encyclopedia, Volume 3: Horror. UK: Aurum Press.

Thriller

Musical

 Green, Stanley (1981). Encyclopedia of the Musical Film. Oxford University Press.
 Hirschhorn, Clive. (1981). Hollywood Musical. Crown.

Road movie

Samurai

Science fiction

Hardy, Phil (1984). The Aurum Film Encyclopedia, Volume 2: Science Fiction. UK: Aurum Press. . Google Books.

Western

Hardy, Phil (1983). The Aurum Film Encyclopedia, Volume 1: The Western. UK: Aurum Press. . Google Books.

Other genres 

 Drama: Cody, Gabrielle H.; Sprinchorn, Evert, eds. (2007). The Columbia Encyclopedia of Modern Drama. Columbia University Press. .
 Pornography/erotic film: 
 Sport film:

Documentary

See also
Bibliography of encyclopedias: film and television
List of books on films
Bibliography of film: film noir
Bibliography of film: documentary
Bibliography of film: horror
Bibliography of works on James Bond

References

External links
The Howard Summers Website: Filmographies by Genre/Type
"Film noir." Encyclopedia Britannica, November 15, 2019